The Daniel Aldrich Cottage and Sawmill is a historic property at 364 Aldrich Street in Uxbridge, Massachusetts.  It includes a c. 1830s late Federal style brick cottage, and at one time also included a rare surviving small-scale sawmill, built about 1835.  They were built by Daniel Aldrich, member of a locally prominent family, were listed on the National Register of Historic Places in 1983.

Description and history
The Daniel Aldrich property is located on the south side of Aldrich Street in a rural area of central southern Uxbridge.  The house is a -story brick structure, with a side gable roof and end chimneys.  The front facade is laid in stretcher bond, while the other sides are laid in common bond.  The front has five bays, with a center entrance flanked by sidelight windows.  A wood-frame Greek Revival ell extends to the east.  Located southwest of the house is a barn.

East of the house, across a small brook, stood a modest single-story wood-frame structure with a gable roof and clapboard siding.  Possibly dating to about the same period as the house, it was a rare surviving example of a small 19th-century sawmill.  Most of the building has been demolished since it was listed on the National Register.

Beginning in the 1820s, Aldrich Village developed as a community of the extended family of the Aldriches. The Aldrich family were Quakers and their community included their homes and businesses they operated.  This property was owned by Daniel Aldrich, who ran a saw mill, a blacksmith shop and a wheelwright shop which produced numerous products such as roof shingles, wagons, lumber.  The property was later taken over by Daniel's son Gideon, but it is not clear if he used the mill in his lumber-related businesses.

See also
National Register of Historic Places listings in Uxbridge, Massachusetts

References

Industrial buildings and structures on the National Register of Historic Places in Massachusetts
Buildings and structures in Uxbridge, Massachusetts
National Register of Historic Places in Uxbridge, Massachusetts
Houses in Worcester County, Massachusetts
Houses on the National Register of Historic Places in Worcester County, Massachusetts